True to the Game is a 2017 American drama film directed by Preston A. Whitmore II, written by Nia Hill, and starring Columbus Short, Andra Fuller, Vivica A. Fox, Nelsan Ellis and Jennifer Freeman. It was based on Teri Woods' novel of the same name.A 2020 sequel named True to the Game 2: Gena's Story was released on November 6, 2020. A second sequel, True to the Game 3, was released in December 3, 2021.

Cast 
 Columbus Short as Quadir Richards
 Draya Michele as Cherelle
 Erica Peeples as Gena Rollins
 Vivica A. Fox as Shoog
 Nelsan Ellis as Tyrik
 Andra Fuller as Jerrell Jackson 
 Jennifer Freeman as Lita
 Nafessa Williams as Sahirah
 Jamaar Simon as Rasun
 Iyana Halley as Bria
 Annika Noelle as Aubrey 
 Misan Akuya as Drug Dealer 
 Starletta DuPois as Gah-Git 
 George Arvanitdis as Club Patron 
 Lorenzo Eduardo as Winston
 Nikki Leigh as Megan

Production
It was reported that a film adaptation of Teri Woods' novel True to the Game would go ahead in December 2015. Columbus Short was reported to have signed on for the lead role on September 17, 2015. The rest of the main cast was announced on October 13, 2015, including Vivica A. Fox, Nelsan Ellis, Andra Fuller. Principal photography began for the film in October 2015 in Los Angeles, California and finished in April 2016. This would be Nelsan Ellis' final film role before his death two months prior to the film's release. The film was dedicated to his memory.

Soundtrack 
True to the Game : Music Features By Keyshia Cole, 21 Savage, Big Block, Kris Kelli and Young Scooter, In 2017—18.

Trilogy  
 The sequel named True to the Game 2: Gena's Story was released in limited theaters on November 6, 2020.
 A third installment named True to the Game 3 was released in limited theaters on December 3, 2021.

References

External links 
 
 
 

2017 films
American thriller drama films
2017 thriller drama films
American romantic thriller films
American romantic drama films
2017 drama films
Films set in Philadelphia
2010s English-language films
2010s American films